Ultimate Dolly Parton is a compilation album by American country music artist Dolly Parton. It was released by RCA Nashville on June 3, 2003. The album peaked at number 10 on the Billboard Top Country Albums chart.

Track listing

Charts

Weekly charts

Year-end charts

Certifications

References

2003 compilation albums
Dolly Parton compilation albums
RCA Records compilation albums